Stanislav Mikheev (born May 21, 1989) is a Russian luger who has competed since the mid-2000s. His best finish at the FIL European Luge Championships was sixth in the men's doubles event at Sigulda in 2010.

Mikheev qualified for the 2010 Winter Olympics where he finished 14th.

References
 FIL-Luge profile

External links
 
 
 

1989 births
Living people
Russian male lugers
Olympic lugers of Russia
Lugers at the 2010 Winter Olympics